Antonio Hart (born September 30, 1968) is a jazz alto saxophonist. He attended the Baltimore School for the Arts, studied with Andy McGhee at Berklee College of Music, and has a master's degree from Queens College, City University of New York. His initial training was classical, but he switched to jazz in college. He gained recognition for his work with Roy Hargrove.

Hart is currently serving as a full-time professor of jazz studies in Aaron Copland School of Music at Queens College City University of New York.

Hart is a member of the Sigma chapter of Alpha Phi Alpha fraternity

Discography

As leader
 1991: For the First Time (Novus)
 1992: Don't You Know I Care with Gary Bartz (Novus)
 1993: For Cannonball and Woody (Novus)
 1994: Tokyo Sessions with Roy Hargrove (Novus)
 1995: It's All Good (Novus)
 1996: Alto Summit (Milestone) with Phil Woods, Vincent Herring, Reuben Rogers 
 1997: Here I Stand (Impulse!/GRP)
 2001: Ama Tu Sonrisa (Enja)
 2004: All We Need (Downtown Sound)
 2015: Blessing (Jazz Legacy)

As sideman
With Rabih Abou-Khalil
 The Cactus of Knowledge (Enja, 2001) – recorded in 2000

With Dee Dee Bridgewater
 This Is New (Verve, 2002) – recorded in 2001

With Terence Blanchard
 Simply Stated (Columbia , 1992)

With Robin Eubanks
 Mental Images (JMT, 1994)

With Dizzy Gillespie
 Bird Songs: The Final Recordings (Telarc, 1992)
 To Bird with Love (Telarc, 1992)

With Roy Hargrove
 Diamond in the Rough (Novus, 1990)
 Public Eye (Novus, 1991)
 The Vibe (Novus, 1992)

With Dave Holland
 What Goes Around (ECM, 2002) – recorded in 2001
 Pass It On (Dare2/Emarcy, 2008) – recorded in 2007
 Pathways (Dare2, 2010) – recorded in 2009

With Wallace Roney
 Crunchin' (Muse, 1993)
With Cecil Brooks III
 Smokin' Jazz (Muse, 1993)
With McCoy Tyner
 Prelude and Sonata (1995)

With Gerald Wilson
 Monterey Moods (Mack Avenue, 2007)
 Detroit (Mack Avenue, 2009)
 Legacy (Mack Avenue, 2011)

References

American jazz musicians
American jazz saxophonists
American male saxophonists
Berklee College of Music alumni
Hard bop saxophonists
Jazz alto saxophonists
Living people
Musicians from Baltimore
Post-bop saxophonists
African-American jazz musicians
1968 births
21st-century American saxophonists
Jazz musicians from Maryland
21st-century American male musicians
American male jazz musicians
21st-century African-American musicians
20th-century African-American people